The M-Pire Shrikez Back is the second studio album by American hip hop trio Originoo Gunn Clappaz. It was released on August 31, 1999 through Duck Down/Priority Records. Production was handled by Emperor Searcy, Robert "Rob" McDowell, Justin "JT" Trugman, Rebell, Baby Paul, DJ Greyboy, Don J, Drew "Dru-Ha" Friedman, Havoc, Knobody, Shaleek and Vincent Davis. It features guest appearances from Boot Camp Clik, Hardcore, Thurderfoot, Havoc and MFC.

The album peaked at number 170 on the Billboard 200. The single "Bounce to the Ounce" received moderate airplay, but not enough to attract strong sales.

Track listing

Charts

References

External links

1999 albums
O.G.C. albums
Duck Down Music albums
Priority Records albums
Albums produced by Havoc (musician)